Scarites quadriceps is a species of ground beetle in the family Carabidae. It is found in North America. It can be found beneath debris on the edges of fields or beaches.

References

Further reading

 
 
 
 
 

Scarites
Beetles described in 1843
Beetles of North America